Scoparia phaealis is a moth in the family Crambidae. It is found in India.

References

Moths described in 1903
Scorparia